Ankur Vasishta (born 27 February 1982), also known as Ankur Sharma, is a Hong Kong cricketer. He made his One Day International debut for Hong Kong against Afghanistan in the 2014 ACC Premier League on 1 May 2014.

References

External links
 

1982 births
Living people
Hong Kong cricketers
Hong Kong One Day International cricketers
Cricketers from Delhi
Indian emigrants to Hong Kong
Hong Kong people of Indian descent